Implicate can refer to:
 Implicature, what is suggested or implied with an utterance, even though it is not literally expressed
 Implicate order, a concept in quantum theory